Consumer Scotland is a non-ministerial office of the Scottish Government. It was established in 2022 following the passage of the Consumer Scotland Act 2020 to act as the statutory, independent voice for consumers in Scotland. This act defines the general functions of the organisation:

Consumer Scotland does not provide consumer advice direct to individuals; the office's role is to gather and use data and analysis to represent consumer interests to the Scottish Parliament, business and the public sector. It receives funding from two sources: the Scottish Government’s annual budget, which is approved by the Scottish Parliament; and levy-funding for specific advocacy activity in the electricity, gas, post and water industries.

In July 2019, the body began to look at issues surrounding delivery charges to consumers in the Highlands and Islands, and encouraged customers to report misleading advertising and sales tactics.

References

External links
Official Website
Consumer Scotland Act 2020

Non-ministerial departments of the Scottish Government
2022 establishments in Scotland
Government agencies established in 2022
Consumer organisations in the United Kingdom
Organisations based in Edinburgh